Toronto is recognized as one of the most diverse and multicultural cities in the world.  The population of Asian descent is over 1 million in the GTA, roughly 20% of the total population. According to Statistics Canada, white population will be the minority in the GTA by year 2031.  With this many Asians living in the GTA, there are numerous cultural events and festivals throughout the year.

References

External links 
 South Asian Events in Toronto

Events in Toronto